The 1982 Seattle Mariners season was their sixth since the franchise creation, and the team finished fourth in the American League West with a record of .

During their first decade, this was the Mariners' best season, their best previous total was 67 wins in 1979. Seattle was at .500 (59–59) on August 17, but then dropped seven straight, and closed the season at home with six consecutive losses.

Home attendance at the Kingdome was 1.07 million, twelfth in the league; it was the first time over a million in five years, since the debut season of 1977.

This was Rene Lachemann's only full year as manager with Seattle; previously the manager at its Class AAA affiliate in Spokane. He took over the major league club in early May 1981, initially on an interim basis, succeeding Maury Wills. Lachemann signed a three-year contract in October 1981, and another during the season in 1982, then was relieved of his duties in late June 1983.

Offseason 
 October 23, 1981: The Mariners traded a player to be named later to the Kansas City Royals for Manny Castillo. The Mariners completed the deal by sending Bud Black to the Royals on March 2, 1982.
 December 9, 1981: Dan Meyer was traded by the Mariners to the Oakland Athletics for Rich Bordi.
 December 11, 1981: Tom Paciorek was traded by the Mariners to the Chicago White Sox for Todd Cruz, Rod Allen and Jim Essian.
 March 5, 1982: Gaylord Perry was signed as a free agent by the Mariners.

Regular season 
The Mariners began the season by beating the Minnesota Twins 11–7, setting a franchise record for most runs scored on Opening Day.

Season standings

Record vs. opponents

Opening Day starters 
Floyd Bannister
Bruce Bochte
Manny Castillo
Al Cowens
Julio Cruz
Todd Cruz
Jim Essian
Jim Maler
Joe Simpson
Richie Zisk

Notable transactions 
 April 1: Shane Rawley was traded by the Mariners to the New York Yankees for Bill Caudill, Gene Nelson, and a player to be named later; Bobby Brown was sent to the Mariners on April  6.
 April 2: Dick Drago was released by the Mariners.
 April 2: Randy Stein was released by the Mariners.
 April 5: Mike Stanton was signed as a free agent by the Mariners.
 May 21: Rick Sweet was purchased by the Mariners from the New York Mets.
 August 6: Dave Revering was signed as a free agent by the Mariners.

Draft picks 
June 7: 1982 Major League Baseball Draft
Spike Owen was selected by the Mariners in the first round (sixth pick).
Lance Johnson was selected by the Mariners in the 31st round, but did not sign.

Roster

Game log

Regular season

|-

|-

|-

|-

|-

|-

|-

|- style="text-align:center;"
| Legend:       = Win       = Loss       = PostponementBold = Mariners team member

Player stats

Batting

Starters by position 
Note: Pos = Position; G = Games played; AB = At bats; H = Hits; Avg. = Batting average; HR = Home runs; RBI = Runs batted in

Other batters

Pitching

Starting pitchers

Other pitchers

Relief pitchers

Farm system

Notes

References 
1982 Seattle Mariners at Baseball Reference
1982 Seattle Mariners team page at www.baseball-almanac.com

Seattle Mariners seasons
Seattle Mariners season
Seattle Mariners